One Piece: World Seeker is an action-adventure video game based on the manga and anime series One Piece. Developed by Ganbarion and published by Bandai Namco Entertainment, the game is the first video game in the franchise to feature an open world environment. The game was released on March 15, 2019 for PlayStation 4, Windows, and Xbox One. Characters that appear in the game include the entire Straw Hat crew, Akainu, Kizaru, Kuma, Tashigi, Smoker, Sabo, Buggy, Rob Lucci, and Ichiji, Niji, and Yonji from Germa 66.

The game features the talents of One Piece anime producer Hiroki Koyama from Toei Animation, One Piece media supervisor Suguru Sugita from Shueisha, One Piece game supervisor Yuji Suzuki from Shueisha, and One Piece game producer Kōji Nakajima from Bandai Namco Entertainment.

Gameplay

One Piece: World Seeker is an action-adventure game which puts players in the role of Monkey D. Luffy from a third-person perspective. One Piece World Seeker is set in the “Prison Island,” which is located in the New World. The player will experience and wage battles in an open world environment which can be freely explored.

The game's combat features stealth elements and Luffy can use the Observation Haki to see enemies from behind walls. Techniques from the anime like Gum Gum Rocket which allows Luffy to easily traverse the world and Gum Gum Bazooka are also featured in the game.

The game also features three DLC packs featuring Roronoa Zoro, Sabo, and Trafalgar Law as playable characters.

Development
On November 2, 2017, the game was announced under the codename Dawn and said to be an "unprecedented" game, later in December 2017, the game's Official title One Piece: World Seeker was revealed and at Jump Festa 2018 the Game's First Trailer was revealed and released on YouTube on December 18, 2017.

The One Piece: World Seeker original soundtrack album by Kohei Tanaka, comprising 56 soundtracks, was released on March 15, 2019. The western version uses an original piece called "Road to Ichiban" instead due to licensing issues.

Reception

The game received "mixed" reviews on all platforms, according to the review aggregation website Metacritic.

In Japan, the game debuted at number two on the charts, selling 51,039 units (PS4 version) in its opening weekend. In two weeks it sold 58,777 units (PS4 version).

Accolades
Despite the mixed reviews, the game was nominated for "Original Light Mix Score, Franchise" at the NAVGTR Awards.

See also
List of One Piece video games

Notes

References

External links
 

2019 video games
Action-adventure games
Bandai Namco games
Open-world video games
World Seeker
PlayStation 4 games
Single-player video games
Video games developed in Japan
Windows games
Xbox One games
Video games scored by Kohei Tanaka
Video games set on fictional islands
Stadia games
Ganbarion games